= Gardener Butte =

Mountain in Oregon, United States

Coordinates: 42.4597685°N 122.5859722°W

Gardener Butte is a summit in the U.S. state of Oregon. The elevation is 2,940 feet (900 m).

Gardener Butte was named in 1884 after Raphael Gardener Sr., a pioneer settler.
